René Paardekooper (born 17 April 1987) is a Dutch former professional footballer who played as a centre-back.

Career

Helmond Sport
Paardekooper was born in Gemert, North Brabant where he started playing football for local club VV Gemert before joining the youth teams of Helmond Sport. He made his professional in the Eerste Divisie on 16 September 2005, coming on as a substitute in injury time for Appie Yahia in a 0–0 draw against Cambuur.

He made 88 total appearances for Helmond Sport between 2010 and 2015, scoring no goals. He left the club in 2010 after his contract expired.

VV Gemert
In 2010, Paardekooper returned to his boyhood club VV Gemert, recently promoted to the fourth-tier Topklasse. He played for the club for five years before retiring from football in 2015.

After football
In 2016, Paardekooper became media advisor for local media outlet Gemert Media.

References

1987 births
Living people
Dutch footballers
Helmond Sport players
Eerste Divisie players
Derde Divisie players
Vierde Divisie players
People from Gemert-Bakel
Association football defenders
Footballers from North Brabant